Na Gyi (born 2 May 1981) is a Burmese film director, known for his films, Mi (2018) and What Happened to the Wolf? (2021). He is considered a promising and prominent filmmaker in Myanmar Cinema. He is one of the founders of Fatty Gangster Production and works as a freelance director, director of photography, and writer. He has produced and directed feature films, music videos, and television commercials.

Early life and education 
Na Gyi was born in Yangon, Myanmar on 2 May 1981. He passed matriculation from BEHS (1), Dagon in 1998. During the study of engineering at Yangon Technology University, he left for London for further study. He studied Digital Filmmaking at Raindance, London. Na Gyi married Paing Phyo Thu, the lead actress from his debut film, Mi on 1 January 2019.

Career 
Na Gyi's career took off when his first feature film, Mi was screened across the country in Myanmar. The film was an adaptation of the novel, "Mi" by prominent and well-respected novelist, Kyi Aye. Although expectations were high, the film was well received by the audience. There were harsh public criticisms at Myanmar Academy Awards (2018) for leaving Mi with no award.

Mi received 2 nominations (Best Actress, Best Film) and 1 award (Best Director of Photography) at ASEAN international Film Festival and Awards, 2019. Mi was also officially selected for Cardiff International Film Festival (2020) and Festival International de Cinema de Lleida Visual Art (2020).

Na Gyi's second film, What Happened to the Wolf? was officially selected and held the world premiere at Oldenburg International Film Festival in 2021. Due to the 2021 Myanmar coup ďétat, Na Gyi and Paing Phyo Thu were in hiding and not able to attend the Oldenburg International Film Festival.

Political activities 
Following the 2021 Myanmar coup d'état, Na Gyi and Paing Phyo Thu were active in anti-coup movements both in person at rallies and through social media. Denouncing the military coup, Na Gyi and Paing Phyo Thu have taken part in the protests since February. On 17 February 2021, warrant for his arrest was issued under section 505 (a) of the Myanmar Penal Code by the State Administration Council for speaking out against the Military Coup and supporting Civil Disobedience Movement (CDM) along with several other celebrities. Na Gyi and Paing Phyo Thu had to go into hiding ever since.

Filmography 
London Tale (2008) (Writer/Director/Actor)
Where do you come from? What are you doing? Where are you going? (2012) (Writer/Director)
Let There Be Dark (short film, 2012) (Associate Producer)
Bo Ma (2014) (Writer/Director)
Mi (2018) (Writer/Director)
What Happened to the Wolf? (2021) (Writer/Director)

Awards and nominations

References

External links 
 Na Gyi on Facebook
 Na Gyi on FilmFreeway
 

1981 births
Living people
Burmese film directors